Madelaine Hasson (born January 4, 1995) is an American actress. She is known for her role as Willa Monday on Fox's television series The Finder. She also co-starred in the ABC Family series Twisted. She starred in the YouTube Premium series Impulse as Henrietta "Henry" Coles.

Early life
Hasson was born in New Bern, North Carolina, the daughter of Catherine and Michael. Hasson grew up in Wilmington, where she attended Cape Fear Academy. She was a competitive dancer in Wilmington's Fox Troupe Dancers for eight years. As a child and young teen, Hasson performed in a variety of stage productions, including Grey Gardens and The Best Little Whorehouse in Texas. She began auditioning for films under a local casting director, Jackie Burch.

Career
Hasson's first callback was for the CW's The Secret Circle. She was not cast, however, and went on to win the role of Willa Monday in Fox's The Finder. In 2012, Hasson traveled to Canton, Ohio to film Underdogs. Hasson co-starred in ABC Family's Twisted as Jo Masterson. In 2015 she appeared as Billie Jean, the second wife and widow of Hank Williams, in the Williams biopic I Saw the Light. That same year she also starred in the indie feature "Good After Bad". In 2016 she starred in the indie feature "Novitiate". Since 2018, she has starred in YouTube's series Impulse as Henrietta "Henry" Coles.

Personal life
Hasson relocated to Los Angeles, California with her mother for her job, and finished high school through online coursework. She lives in Los Angeles.

She came out as bisexual in January 2021. Hasson has been married to Julian Brink since 2015.

Filmography

Film

Television

Awards and nominations

References

External links
 
 

1995 births
21st-century American actresses
Actresses from North Carolina
American child actresses
American film actresses
American television actresses
Living people
Actors from Wilmington, North Carolina
Bisexual actresses
People from New Bern, North Carolina
American bisexual actors